Thieux may refer to:
 Thieux, Oise
 Thieux, Seine-et-Marne

See also
Theux, Belgium